Piz Boval is a mountain of the Bernina Range, located north of Piz Bernina in the Swiss canton of Graubünden. It lies on the ridge that separate the Val Roseg (west) from the valley of the Morteratsch Glacier (east).

References

External links
 Piz Boval on Hikr

Bernina Range
Mountains of Graubünden
Mountains of the Alps
Alpine three-thousanders
Mountains of Switzerland
Samedan
Pontresina